Carry-On is an upcoming American action thriller film written by T.J. Fixman and Michael Green, directed by Jaume Collet-Serra and stars Taron Egerton and Jason Bateman.  It is set to be released on Netflix.

Premise
A mysterious traveler blackmails Ethan Kopek, a young TSA agent, to let a dangerous package slip through security and onto a Christmas Day flight.

Cast
 Taron Egerton as Ethan Kopek
 Jason Bateman as Mysterious Traveler
 Logan Marshall-Green
 Sofia Carson
 Danielle Deadwyler
 Theo Rossi
 Dean Norris
 Sinqua Walls
 Josh Brener
 Joe Williamson
 Curtiss Cook
 Tonatiuh Elizarraraz
 Gil Perez-Abraham

Production 
In June 2021, Amblin Partners signed a deal with Netflix to produce multiple films per year for the streaming service. Carry-On will be the first film to come from the deal.

In July 2022, it was announced that Taron Egerton was attached to star in the lead role of Ethan Kopek. In August 2022, Jason Bateman joined the film co-starring alongside Egerton as the mysterious traveler. Sofia Carson and Danielle Deadwyler joined the cast in September 2022. Theo Rossi joined the cast in October 2022. Dean Norris, Logan Marshall-Green and Sinqua Walls were among the eight new cast additions to join the film later that month. 

While principal photography was set to begin on September 26, 2022, it began on October 18 in New Orleans, Louisiana, and wrapped in late January 2023.

References

External links
 

Upcoming films
Amblin Entertainment films
American action thriller films
English-language Netflix original films
Films directed by Jaume Collet-Serra
Upcoming English-language films
Upcoming Netflix original films